There are at least two places called Jarash:

Jerash, a city in Jordan where there are ancient ruins
Jarash, Jerusalem, a former Palestinian village